MSNBC (originally the Microsoft National Broadcasting Company) is an American news-based television channel and website. It is owned by NBCUniversala subsidiary of Comcast. Headquartered in New York City, it provides news coverage and political commentary.

As of September 2018, approximately 87 million households in the United States (90.7 percent of pay television subscribers) were receiving MSNBC. In 2022, MSNBC averaged 1.2 million weekday primetime viewers, behind rival Fox News, which averaged 2.3 million viewers.

MSNBC and its website were founded in 1996 under a partnership between Microsoft and General Electric's NBC unit, hence the network's naming. Microsoft divested itself of its stakes in the MSNBC channel in 2005 and its stakes in msnbc.com in July 2012. The general news site was rebranded as NBCNews.com, and a new msnbc.com was created as the online home of the cable channel. In the late summer of 2015, MSNBC revamped its programming by entering into a dual editorial relationship with its organizational parent NBC News. MSNBC Live, the network's flagship daytime news platform, was expanded to cover over eight hours of the day.

History

Development
MSNBC was established under a strategic partnership between NBC and Microsoft. NBC executive Tom Rogers was instrumental in developing this partnership. James Kinsella, a Microsoft executive, served as president of the online component, MSNBC.com, and represented the tech company in the joint venture. Microsoft invested $221 million for a 50 percent share of the cable channel. MSNBC and Microsoft shared the cost of a $200 million newsroom in Secaucus, New Jersey, for msnbc.com. The network took over the channel space of NBC's 2-year-old America's Talking (AT) network, although in most cases cable carriage had to be negotiated with providers who had never carried AT.

Early history

MSNBC was launched on July 15, 1996. The first show was anchored by Jodi Applegate and included news, interviews, and commentary. During the day, rolling news coverage continued with The Contributors, a show that featured Ann Coulter and Laura Ingraham, as well as interactive programming coordinated by Applegate, John Gibson, and John Seigenthaler. Stories were generally longer and more detailed than the stories CNN was running. NBC also highlighted their broadcast connections by airing stories directly from NBC's network affiliates, along with breaking news coverage from the same sources.

MSNBC gradually increased its emphasis on politics. After completing its seven-year survey of cable channels, the Project for Excellence in Journalism said in 2007 that "MSNBC is moving to make politics a brand, with a large dose of opinion and personality."

In January 2001, Mike Barnicle's MSNBC show started, but it was canceled in June 2001 because of high production costs. In June, Microsoft chief executive officer Steve Ballmer said that he would not have started MSNBC had he foreseen the difficulty of attracting viewers.

After the September 11, 2001 attacks, NBC used MSNBC as an outlet for the up-to-the-minute coverage being provided by NBC News as a supplement to the longer stories on broadcast NBC. With little financial news to cover, CNBC and CNBC Europe ran MSNBC for many hours each day following the attacks. The year also boosted the profile of Ashleigh Banfield, who was present during the collapse of Building 7 while covering the World Trade Center on September 11. Her Region In Conflict program capitalized on her newfound celebrity and showcased exclusive interviews from Afghanistan.

In the aftermath of September 11, MSNBC began calling itself "America's NewsChannel" and hired opinionated hosts like Alan Keyes, Phil Donahue, Pat Buchanan, and Tucker Carlson. This branding makeover, however, was followed by declining ratings.

On December 23, 2005, NBC Universal announced its acquisition of an additional 32 percent share of MSNBC from Microsoft, which solidified its control over television operations and allowed NBC to further consolidate MSNBC's backroom operations with NBC News and its other cable properties. (The news website msnbc.com remained a separate joint venture between Microsoft and NBC for another seven years.) NBC later exercised its option to purchase Microsoft's remaining 18 percent interest in MSNBC.

In late 2005, MSNBC began attracting liberal and progressive viewers as Keith Olbermann began critiquing and satirizing conservative media commentators during his Countdown With Keith Olbermann program. He especially focused his attention on the Fox News Channel and Bill O'Reilly, its principal primetime commentator.

On June 7, 2006, Rick Kaplan resigned as president of MSNBC after holding the post for two years. Five days later, Dan Abrams, a nine-year veteran of MSNBC and NBC News, was named general manager of MSNBC with immediate effect. NBC News senior vice president Phil Griffin would oversee MSNBC while continuing to oversee NBC News' Today program, with Abrams reporting to Griffin.

On June 29, 2006, Abrams announced the revamp of MSNBC's early-primetime and primetime schedule. On July 10, Tucker (formerly The Situation with Tucker Carlson) started airing at 4 p.m. and 6 p.m. ET (taking over Abrams' old timeslot), while Rita Cosby's Live & Direct was canceled. Cosby was made the primary anchor for MSNBC Investigates at 10 and 11 p.m. ET, a new program that took over Cosby and Carlson's timeslots. According to the press release, MSNBC Investigates promised to "complement MSNBC's existing programming by building on [the channel's] library of award-winning documentaries." The move to taped programming during 10 and 11 p.m. probably resulted from MSNBC's successful Friday "experiment" of replacing all primetime programming with taped specials.

On September 24, 2007, Abrams announced that he was leaving his general manager position so he could focus on his 9:00 p.m. ET talk show, Live With Dan Abrams. Oversight of MSNBC was shifted to Phil Griffin, a senior vice president at NBC.

MSNBC and NBC News began broadcasting from their new studios at NBC's 30 Rockefeller Center complex in New York City on October 22, 2007. The extensive renovations of the associated studios allowed NBC to merge its entire news operation into one building. All MSNBC broadcasts and NBC Nightly News originate from the new studios. More than 12.5 hours of live television across the NBC News family originate from the New York studios daily. MSNBC also announced new studios near the Universal Studios lot. MSNBC's master control did not make the move to 30 Rock. It remained in the old Secaucus headquarters until it completed its move to the NBC Universal Network Origination Center located inside the CNBC Global Headquarters building in Englewood Cliffs, New Jersey, on December 21, 2007. Shortly thereafter, Major League Baseball firmed up a long-term lease of the former MSNBC building to become the home studios of MLB Network, which launched from the facility on January 1, 2009.

2008–2015

From mid-2007 to mid-2008, MSNBC enjoyed a large increase in its Nielsen ratings. Primetime viewings increased by 61 percent. In May 2008, NBC News president Steve Capus said, "It used to be people didn't have to worry about MSNBC because it was an also-ran cable channel.... That's not the case anymore." Tim Russert's sudden death in June 2008 removed the person whom The Wall Street Journal called the "rudder for the network" and led to a period of transition.

During the 2008 presidential election, MSNBC's coverage was anchored by Olbermann, Chris Matthews, and David Gregory. They were widely viewed as the face of the channel's political coverage. During the first three months of the presidential campaign, MSNBC's ratings grew by 158 percent. Olbermann and Matthews, however, were criticized for expressing left-leaning opinions on the channel. Both were later removed from their anchor positions. Audience viewership during the 2008 presidential campaign more than doubled from the 2004 presidential election, and the channel topped CNN in ratings for the first time during the last three months of the campaign in the key 25–54 age demographic.

In September 2008, the channel hired political analyst and Air America Radio personality Rachel Maddow to host a new political opinion program called The Rachel Maddow Show. The move to create a new program for the channel was widely seen as a well-calculated ratings move, where beforehand, MSNBC lagged behind in coveted primetime ratings. The show regularly outperformed CNN's Larry King Live, and made the channel competitive in the program's time slot for the first time in over a decade.

In the first quarter of 2010, MSNBC beat CNN in primetime and overall ratings, marking the first time doing so since 2001. The channel also beat CNN in total adult viewers in March, marking the seventh out of the past eight months that MSNBC achieved that result. In addition, the programs Morning Joe, The Ed Show, Hardball with Chris Matthews, Countdown with Keith Olbermann, and The Rachel Maddow Show finished ahead of their time slot competitors at CNN.

In the third quarter of 2010, MSNBC continued its solid lead over CNN, beating the network in total day for the first time since the second quarter of 2001 in the key adult demographic. The network also beat CNN for the fourth consecutive quarter, among both primetime and total viewers, as well as becoming the only cable news network to have its key adult demographic viewership grow over the last quarter, increasing by 4 percent. During this time, MSNBC also became the number-one cable news network in primetime among both African American and Hispanic viewers.

On October 11, 2010, MSNBC unveiled a new televised advertising campaign and slogan called "Lean Forward". "We've taken on CNN and we beat them," MSNBC president Phil Griffin told employees at a series of celebratory "town hall" meetings. "Now it's time to take on Fox." Concerning the campaign, Griffin said, "It is active, it is positive, it is about making tomorrow better than today, a discussion about politics and the actions and passions of our time." The new campaign embraces the network's politically progressive identity. The two-year advertising campaign would cost $2 million and consist of internet, television, and print advertising. The new positioning has created brand image issues for msnbc.com, the umbrella website for the television network. A New York Times article quotes Charlie Tillinghast, president of msnbc.com, a separate company, as saying, "Both strategies are fine, but naming them the same thing is brand insanity." As a result, msnbc.com eventually changed its name to prevent confusion with the television network, MSNBC; it rebranded the more news-driven msnbc.com as NBCNews.com in July 2012.

On January 21, 2011, Olbermann announced his departure from MSNBC and the episode would be the final episode of Countdown. His departure received much media attention. MSNBC issued a statement that it had ended its contract with Olbermann, with no further explanation. Olbermann later revealed that he had taken his show to Current TV.

NBCUniversal News Group was created on July 19, 2012, under chairwoman Pat Fili-Krushe. It has been the news division of NBCUniversal. It is composed of the NBC News, CNBC and MSNBC units.

During 2014, MSNBC's total ratings in the 25–54 demographic declined 20 percent, falling to third place behind CNN. Nevertheless, MSNBC retained its lead among the Hispanic and African-American demographics.

Return to hard news and alignment with NBC News: since 2015

In 2015, to help revive the struggling network, Griffin announced he was transitioning MSNBC from left-leaning, opinionated programming to hard news programming. Nearly all daytime opinionated news programs were replaced with more generic news programs. Ronan Farrow, Joy Reid, Krystal Ball, Touré, Abby Huntsman, Alex Wagner, and Ed Schultz lost their shows. Al Sharpton's PoliticsNation was relegated to the weekend. News programs presented by established NBC News personalities such as Telemundo anchor Jose Diaz-Balart, Meet the Press anchor Chuck Todd, NBC Nightly News Sunday anchor Kate Snow, Thomas Roberts, and former NBC Nightly News anchor Brian Williams replaced the opinion shows. The revamped on-air presentation debuted in late summer 2015 and included a new logo, news ticker, and graphics package. MSNBC Live had at least eight hours of programming each day, barring any breaking news that could extend its time.  Daytime news coverage was led primarily by Brian Williams, Stephanie Ruhle, Jose Diaz-Balart, Andrea Mitchell, Craig Melvin, Thomas Roberts, and Kate Snow, in addition to "beat leaders" stationed throughout the newsroom. These included chief legal correspondent Ari Melber, primary political reporter Steve Kornacki, business and finance correspondent Olivia Sterns, and senior editor Cal Perry. Morning and primetime programming did not change and remained filled mostly by opinionated personalities.

In April 2016, MSNBC launched a promotional ad campaign with the theme, "in order to know beyond, you have to go beyond." The campaign portrayed MSNBC's reporting and perspectives as "in depth" and an alternative to "talking points" coverage on other cable news outlets. A new tagline "This is who we are" appeared on MSNBC in June 2016. Promotional campaigns including the slogan were aired in March 2017.

In July 2016, the network debuted Dateline Extra, which was an abridged version of Dateline NBC and another step towards aligning MSNBC and NBC News. The new program was hosted by MSNBC Live anchor Tamron Hall.

In September 2016, MSNBC launched The 11th Hour with Brian Williams as a nightly wrap-up of the day's news and a preview of the following day's headlines. This was MSNBC's first new primetime program in nearly four years.

In January 2017, MSNBC debuted a program in the 6 pm EST hour entitled For the Record with Greta, hosted by former Fox News Channel anchor Greta Van Susteren. The program aired for six months before being cancelled in late June 2017. The network promoted Ari Melber, the network's chief legal correspondent, to host The Beat with Ari Melber at 6pm.

In March 2017, MSNBC began to increase its use of the NBC News branding during daytime news programming, as part of an effort to emphasize MSNBC's relationship with the division. On May 8, 2017, MSNBC introduced a new late-afternoon program, Deadline: White House, hosted by NBC political analyst former White House communications director Nicolle Wallace. That month, MSNBC became the highest rated American cable news network in primetime for the first time. MSNBC's increasing viewership was accompanied by declining numbers at Fox News Channel. MSNBC's May 15–19 programming topped the programming of both CNN and Fox News in total viewers and viewers 18–49.

On April 16, 2018, MSNBC premiered a new early morning program, Morning Joe First Look, to replace Way Too Early. The same day, MSNBC also retired its on-air news ticker, citing a desire to reduce distractions and "[put] our reporting more front and center".

On March 2, 2020, Chris Matthews abruptly announced his resignation from Hardball effective immediately, after comparing the rise of Bernie Sanders in the 2020 presidential campaign to the German invasion of France. The 7 p.m. hour was hosted by rotating anchors until July 20, when it was replaced by The ReidOut with Joy Reid.

On December 7, 2020, MSNBC announced that Rashida Jones would succeed Griffin as president in 2021. Jones stated goals to increase the network's investment into documentary-style programs, and to have viewers "clearly understand" the differences and value of its news-based and analysis-driven programming, as both were "critical to our future success", and "need to exist in a clear and compelling form on every single platform where news consumers go." As part of this remit, Jones named separate senior vice presidents for news programming and "perspective and analysis" programming.

In January 2021, MSNBC had its highest-rated week ever in the wake of the January 6 United States Capitol attack, exceeding the ratings of Fox News for the first time since 2000.

On March 29, 2021, MSNBC introduced a refreshed logo and on-air imaging, including a rebranding of its MSNBC Live rolling news block as MSNBC Reports (in support of Jones' goal of clearer separation between news- and analysis-based programs).

Brian Williams departed the network in late 2021 and was succeeded on The 11th Hour by Stephanie Ruhle. Meanwhile, as part of her new contract with NBCUniversal, Rachel Maddow took an extended hiatus from her program in order to focus on other film and podcast projects, with rotating guest hosts filling in for her. Upon Maddow's return, she announced that she would only host the show on Monday nights beginning in May 2022, and continue to feature guest hosts throughout the rest of the week. The guest hosts appeared under the MSNBC Prime banner until August 16, 2022, when Alex Wagner returned to host Alex Wagner Tonight in that timeslot. During the months of October and November and with the 2022 United States elections, Steve Kornacki started hosting The Kornacki Countdown every Friday, temporarily replacing The Last Word with Lawrence O'Donnell from October 14 to Election Day November 8.<ref>{{cite web|title=MSNBC, Fox, Telemundo offering specials ahead of midterms|url=https://www.newscaststudio.com/2022/10/14/msnbc-fox-telemundo-2022-election-preview-shows/|work=NewscastStudio|first=Michael P|last=Hill|date=October 14, 2022}}</ref>

On March 10, 2022, MSNBC announced it would offer on-demand episodes of all of its news programming, excluding MSNBC Reports, The Rachel Maddow Show, and Alex Wagner Tonight on Peacock, and The Choice from MSNBC folded into the MSNBC hub on the service, where it would also include documentaries from MSNBC Films.

 Ratings and reception 
As of September 2018, approximately 87 million households in the United States were receiving MSNBC, amounting to 90.7 percent of pay television subscribers. Nielsen ratings showed that MSNBC ranked second among basic cable networks averaging 1.8 million viewers in 2019, behind rival Fox News. 

In 2022, average weekday primetime viewership was 1.2 million, compared to rival Fox News's 2.3 million, a decline of 21% from the previous year, and with 148,000 viewers in the "key demographic" of viewers aged 25-54. During the first night of the 2020 Democratic National Convention, MSNBC had an average viewership of over 5 million, the highest among three major cable news networks and ahead of CNN.

 Demographics 
A 2014 Pew Research Center study found that MSNBC's audience was more moderate than that of BuzzFeed, Politico, The Washington Post, and The New York Times, but slightly more liberal than CNN's audience.

A 2019 Pew Research Center survey showed that among Americans who named MSNBC as their main source for political news, 74% are ages 50 or older, with 44% ages 65 or older. 95% of those who named MSNBC as their main political news source identify as Democrats; among the eight most commonly named main sources for political and election news by US adults, MSNBC and Fox News have the most partisan audiences.

 Carriage issues 

Before 2010, MSNBC was not available to Verizon FiOS and AT&T U-verse television subscribers in the portions of New York State, northern New Jersey, and Connecticut that overlapped Cablevision's service area. One of several reasons for this was an exclusive carriage agreement between MSNBC and Cablevision that prohibited competing wired providers from carrying MSNBC. The terms of the agreement were not publicly known.

In 2009, Verizon filed a formal "program-access complaint" with the Federal Communications Commission and petitioned for termination of the deal. In support of Verizon, Connecticut Attorney General Richard Blumenthal argued that the arrangement could be illegal. After entering into a new contract, FiOS added the channel in New York City and New Jersey on February 2, 2010.

MSNBC International

In southern Africa, MSNBC is distributed free-to-air on satellite on Free2View TV as MSNBC Africa, a joint venture between Great Media Limited and MSNBC. Free2View airs MSNBC's programming from 4 p.m. to midnight ET in a block that repeats twice (live for the first airing), with local Weather Channel forecasts.

In Australia, MSNBC launched November 2019 on the Fetch TV online PayTV network, on channel 171. As in Canada, this is a direct US feed of MSNBC, without any delay. Although Fetch TV has no MSNBC catchup channel/service, it also offers MSNBC programs on a reverse EPG which allows any shows from the previous 24 hours to be selected and watched.

In Asia and Europe, MSNBC is not shown on a dedicated channel. When MSNBC started in 1996, they announced plans to start broadcasting in Europe during 1997. This never happened although MSNBC was seen occasionally on affiliate channel CNBC Europe until the end of the 2000s, showing the channel overnight at the weekend and during the afternoon on American public holidays as well as during breaking news events.

In Turkey, NTV-MSNBC is the news channel of the Turkish broadcaster NTV Turkey. The channel is a joint partnership between the two, although very little Turkish content is shown on English MSNBC. English content on MSNBC is translated into Turkish.

 Online 

MSNBC and its website msnbc.com were launched concurrently. Unlike the network, msnbc.com was operated as the general online news outlet of NBC News in partnership with Microsoft's MSN.com portal. The network and website also remained editorially separate. The website did not adopt the network's increasingly liberal viewpoints and remained a joint venture with Microsoft even after it had sold its stake in MSNBC.

In July 2012, NBC acquired Microsoft's remaining stake in msnbc.com and re-branded it as NBCNews.com. After being redirected to the new name for a period, msnbc.com was re-launched in 2013 as the website for MSNBC. The website included opinion columns from hosts, correspondents, and guests, along with live and on-demand videos from MSNBC programs.

Shift

In July 2014, msnbc.com launched msnbc2, a brand for several web-only series hosted by MSNBC personalities. In December 2014, msnbc2 was renamed shift, with a programming schedule that was less focused on politics and more tailored to a younger audience.

Radio
MSNBC launched on XM Satellite Radio channel 120 and Sirius Satellite Radio channel 90 on April 12, 2010. This is the second time MSNBC has been available on satellite radio. The channel was dropped from XM Radio on September 4, 2006.

The simulcast of MSNBC's programming is on SiriusXM channel 118.

Controversies

Liberal bias

According to the Encyclopædia Britannica, "MSNBC is generally considered to be liberal or left-leaning."

In November 2007, a New York Times article stated that MSNBC's primetime lineup was tilting more to the left. Since then, commentators have argued that MSNBC has a bias towards liberal politics and the Democratic Party. Washington Post media analyst Howard Kurtz said that the channel's evening lineup "has clearly gravitated to the left in recent years and often seems to regard itself as the antithesis of Fox News." In 2011, Politico referred to MSNBC as "left-leaning", and Steve Kornacki of Salon.com stated that, "MSNBC's prime-time lineup is now awash in progressive politics." Regarding changes in the channel's evening programming, senior vice president of NBC News Phil Griffin said that "it happened naturally. There isn't a dogma we're putting through. There is a 'Go for it.'"

In the February 2008 issue of Men's Journal magazine, an MSNBC interviewee quoted a senior executive as saying that liberal commentator Keith Olbermann "runs MSNBC" and that "because of his success, he's in charge" of the channel. In 2007, The New York Times called Olbermann MSNBC's "most recognizable face". In September 2008, MSNBC stated that Olbermann and Chris Matthews would no longer anchor live political events, with David Gregory assuming that role. MSNBC cited the growing criticism that they were "too opinionated to be seen as neutral in the heat of the presidential campaign." Olbermann's show Countdown continued to run before and after the presidential and vice presidential debates, and both Matthews and Olbermann joined Gregory on the channel's election night coverage.

On November 13, 2009, in the days leading up to the release of 2008 Republican vice presidential candidate Sarah Palin's book Going Rogue, MSNBC's Dylan Ratigan used photoshopped pictures of Palin on the channel's Morning Meeting program. Ratigan apologized a few days later.

In October 2010, MSNBC began using the tagline "Lean Forward". Some media outlets, including msnbc.com, claimed that the network was now embracing its politically progressive identity.

In January 2012, MSNBC used Rachel Maddow, Chris Matthews, and other network commentators during its coverage of the Iowa Republican caucuses. Nando Di Fino of the Mediaite website said MSNBC was  "giving up on the straight news coverage, and instead [appearing] to be aiming to create some controversy."

In November 2012, The New York Times called MSNBC "The Anti-Fox" and quoted former President Bill Clinton as saying, "Boy, it really has become our version of Fox." Citing data from the A.C. Nielsen TV ratings service, the article noted that while the Fox News Channel had a larger overall viewership than MSNBC, the two networks were separated by only around 300,000 viewers among the 25–54 age bracket most attractive to advertisers.

In the Pew Research Center's 2013 "State of the News Media" report, MSNBC was found to be the most opinionated news network, with 85 percent of the content being commentary or opinions and the remaining 15 percent being factual reporting. The report also stated that in 2012, MSNBC spent only $240 million on news production compared to CNN's $682 million and the Fox News Channel's $820 million.

In October 2019, American socialist magazine Jacobin argued that "MSNBC embodies the politics and sensibility of Trump-era liberalism.", but argued that MSNBC "wasn't always liberal."

Writing for the Poynter Institute for Media Studies in February 2021, senior media writer Tom Jones argued that the primary distinction between MSNBC and Fox News is not left bias vs. right bias, but rather that much of the content on Fox News, especially during its primetime programs, is not based in truth.

Favoritism towards Barack Obama
Some Democratic Party supporters, including former Pennsylvania governor Ed Rendell and Bill Clinton advisor Lanny Davis, criticized MSNBC during and after the 2008 Democratic Party primaries as covering Barack Obama more favorably than Hillary Clinton. Rendell said, "MSNBC was the official network of the Obama campaign," and called their coverage "absolutely embarrassing". Rendell later became an on-air contributor to MSNBC.

A study done by the Project for Excellence in Journalism showed that MSNBC had less negative coverage of Obama (14 percent of stories versus 29 percent in the press overall) and more negative stories about Republican presidential candidate John McCain (73 percent of its coverage versus 57 percent in the press overall). MSNBC's on-air slogan during the week of the 2008 presidential election, "The Power of Change", was criticized for being too similar to Obama's campaign slogan of "Hope and Change". After the election, conservative talk show host John Ziegler made a documentary entitled Media Malpractice.... How Obama Got Elected, which was very critical of the media's role, especially MSNBC's, in the election. While promoting the documentary, he had an on-air dispute with MSNBC news anchor Contessa Brewer about how the media, especially MSNBC, had portrayed Sarah Palin.

During MSNBC's coverage of the Potomac primary, MSNBC's Chris Matthews said, "I have to tell you, you know, it's part of reporting this case, this election, the feeling most people get when they hear Barack Obama's speech. My, I felt this thrill going up my leg. I mean, I don't have that too often." This led Fox News to assert that both he and MSNBC were biased toward Obama.

Rise of the New Right documentary
In June 2010, the MSNBC documentary Rise of the New Right aired. It featured interviews with right-wing figures, including Dick Armey, the former House majority leader, Orly Taitz, a leading figure in the "birther" movement, and conspiracy theorist radio host Alex Jones. The documentary also showed the Michigan Militia's survival training camp and hit the campaign trail with Kentucky senatorial candidate Rand Paul.

The documentary angered Tea Party movement figures and others on the right. After the documentary aired, FreedomWorks, chaired by Armey, called for a boycott of Dawn and Procter & Gamble, which advertised during Hardball with Chris Matthews. The attempted boycott was ineffective as Procter & Gamble continued to advertise on the show.

Romney coverage during 2012 election
A study by the Pew Research Center's Project for Excellence in Journalism found that MSNBC's coverage of Mitt Romney during the final week of the 2012 presidential campaign (68 percent negative with no positive stories in the sample) was far more negative than the overall press, and even more negative than it had been during October 1 to 28, when 5 percent was positive, and 57 percent was negative. On the other hand, their coverage of Barack Obama improved in the final week before the presidential election. From October 1 to 28, 33 percent of stories were positive and 13 percent negative. During the campaign's final week, 51 percent of MSNBC's stories were positive, while there were no negative stories about Obama in the sample.

Allegations of conservative bias
Others have argued that MSNBC has a bias against progressive politics. Phil Donahue's show was canceled in 2003 due to his opposition to the Iraq War, and Donahue later commented that the management of MSNBC required that "we have two conservative (guests) for every liberal. I was counted as two liberals." Cenk Uygur, after his departure from MSNBC in 2011, said that MSNBC management had told him "people in Washington" were "concerned about [his] tone," and that he "didn't want to work in a place that didn't challenge power."

Others have also noted that MSNBC anchors tended to be conservative or centrist and wealthy. For example, in 2000, host Joe Scarborough received a 95 rating from the American Conservative Union and supported anti-abortion policies when he was a U.S. representative, while host Stephanie Ruhle, a former hedge fund manager, declared, "I don't have any political ideals that I'm tied to." Former host Chris Matthews identifies as a "liberal" but voted for George W. Bush in 2000, while current host Nicolle Wallace, a registered Republican, worked for both Bush and Sarah Palin.

Lack of diversity of views
Maria Bustillos noted in 2019 that "MSNBC's bland, evenhanded respectability is buttressed with a careful performance of diversity both 'ideological' and demographic", and that "the network actively discourages consideration of its anchors' personal convictions" in favor of "interchangeable 'television personalities'" who are "compressed into the network's identity and subservient to it." It has been argued that MSNBC, like other cable networks, "is simply not incentivized to be informative", and instead turns its "viewers into partisan junkies who don't change the channel because they need a fix that tells them they're right about everything (and that the other side is wrong)." Jason Linkins in 2014 claimed that MSNBC prefers "the incessant production of insidery ideations" over "the service of the public trust in an honest and equitable way."

Romney family grandchild

Political commentator Melissa Harris-Perry and her guest panel, in a look back on the 2013 segment of her show, featured a picture of former Republican presidential candidate Mitt Romney and his extended family. Romney was holding on his knee his adopted grandchild, Kieran Romney, an African-American. Harris-Perry and her guests, including actress Pia Glenn and comedian Dean Obeidallah, joked about coming up with captions for the photo. Glenn sang out, "One of these things is not like the others, one of these things just isn't the same." Obeidallah said, "It sums up the diversity of the Republican Party and the [Republican National Committee], where they have the whole convention and they find the one black person." Afterwards, Harris-Perry gave an on-air apology as well as apologized in a series of tweets.

 Coverage of the 2020 Democratic primary 
On February 2, 2019, NBC ran a story about presidential candidate Tulsi Gabbard claiming that her campaign was benefiting from Russian state media, stating that she had received twice as many mentions on RT, Sputnik News and Russia Insider compared to expected front-runners Bernie Sanders and Joe Biden.

In March 2019, Yashar Ali, a journalist for The Huffington Post accused Dafna Linzer, a managing editor at MSNBC, of ceding editorial control to the Democratic National Committee. Ali, who planned to announce the locations of the DNC debates in advance of MSNBC, received a call attempting to dissuade him with the phrase "let them make a few phone calls," referring to party leaders. A source quoted by CNN stated that this approach was necessary for any network that has enough of a relationship with the DNC to host its debates.

Candidate Andrew Yang and his supporters have been critical of MSNBC's coverage of his campaign and the speaking time allocated to Yang at a November 2019 primary debate hosted by MSNBC.

In December 2019, In These Times analyzed coverage of the 2020 Democratic Party presidential primary by MSNBC between August and September 2019. They said that "MSNBC talked about Biden twice as often as Warren and three times as often as Sanders", and that Sanders was the candidate spoken of negatively the most frequently of the three."

MSNBC came under particular scrutiny during the first three primary-season state votes in 2020 due to historical references made by two of their hosts. Chris Matthews compared Sanders to George McGovern in terms of electability on February 3 and criticized Sanders for adopting the "democratic socialist" label on February 7. In reference to Sanders' praise of some aspects of Fidel Castro's Cuba, Matthews said on air during Hardball, "I believe if Castro and the Reds had won the Cold War there would have been executions in Central Park, and I might have been one of the ones executed". He then questioned what Sanders meant when he used the term 'socialism'. The following week, Chuck Todd criticized the rhetoric of Sanders supporters by quoting a conservative article which compared them to Nazi brown shirts. Commenting on the 2020 Nevada Democratic caucuses, Matthews invoked "the fall of France" to the Nazis in 1940 as a metaphor for Sanders' apparent victory in the state. These analogies were criticized by the Sanders campaign and other commentators, who noted that members of Sanders' family had been murdered in the Holocaust. Matthews later issued an on-air apology to Sanders and his supporters.

Jason Johnson, an MSNBC contributor, was temporarily suspended in February 2020 after backlash over his accusing Bernie Sanders supporters of alienating minorities and saying of African-American Sanders staffers and surrogates, "I don't care how many people from the island of misfit black girls that you throw out to defend you on a regular basis." He was reinstated in July 2020.

Suspensions of hosts

Michael Savage
Michael Savage briefly hosted a weekend talk show in 2003. That July, Savage responded to a prank caller on his show by calling him a "pig" and a "sodomite", and telling him he "should get AIDS and die." Savage's show was canceled and he was dismissed from MSNBC shortly thereafter.

Don Imus
Don Imus' radio show Imus in the Morning was simulcast on MSNBC for over ten years. In 2007, he described members of the Rutgers University women's basketball team as "some nappy-headed hoes."  The racist remark was met with outrage, and advertisers withdrew from the show, with MSNBC canceling the simulcast. Both Imus and NBC News apologized to the Rutgers Basketball team for the remarks.

Keith Olbermann and Joe Scarborough
On November 5, 2010, MSNBC President Phil Griffin suspended Keith Olbermann indefinitely without pay for having contributed $2,400 (the maximum personal donation limit) to each of three Democratic Party candidates during the 2010 midterm election cycle. NBC News policy prohibited contributions to political campaigns unless NBC News had given its prior permission. On November 7, 2010, Olbermann posted a thank you message to supporters via Twitter. That same day, MSNBC announced that he would be back on the air starting on November 9.

Two weeks later, Griffin announced the suspension of Joe Scarborough for similar misconduct. The Morning Joe host had donated $4,000 to Republican candidates in Florida. Like Olbermann's suspension, Scarborough's was brief, and he returned to the airwaves on November 24.

Martin Bashir
Host Martin Bashir resigned after making a controversial comment about 
Sarah Palin. On November 15, 2013, Bashir criticized Palin for equating the federal debt to slavery. Bashir referred to the cruel and barbaric punishment of slaves as described by slave overseer Thomas Thistlewood, specifically a punishment called "Derby's dose", which forced slaves to defecate or urinate into the mouth of another slave. Bashir then said, "When Mrs. Palin invokes slavery, she doesn't just prove her rank ignorance. She confirms if anyone truly qualified for a dose of discipline from Thomas Thistlewood, she would be the outstanding candidate."

Alec Baldwin
Alec Baldwin's 2013 show Up Late with Alec Baldwin was suspended after five episodes because of a homophobic slur Baldwin made to a photographer in New York City.

References

Further reading
 

External links

 
 Official YouTube channel
  (MSNBC News''; July 29, 2022)

 
1996 establishments in New York (state)
24-hour television news channels in the United States
American news websites
Companies based in New York City
English-language television stations in the United States
Liberalism in the United States
NBCUniversal networks
Progressivism in the United States
Television channels and stations established in 1996
Television networks in the United States
Former General Electric subsidiaries
Former Microsoft subsidiaries
Sirius XM Radio channels